Diloma is a genus of medium-sized sea snails, marine gastropod mollusks in the family Trochidae, the top snails.

There is also a genus Diloma, F.H.Wind & P.Cepek, 1979 a genus of phytoplankton in the class Prymnesiophyceae

Description
The solid shell is imperforate and depressed globose. It is slate-colored or black, sometimes (especially if worn) reddish or brownish. The conic spire is short. The apex is acute, usually reddish. The sutures are linear. The five whorls are slightly convex, rapidly increasing and spirally obsoletely striate. The body whorl is usually depressed or subconcave below the suture. The base of the shell is rounded, eroded and iridescent in front of the aperture. The aperture is huge, oblique iridescent. The outer lip is rather thin, not black-margined within; but bordered by a brilliantly iridescent band; The columella is concave, obsoletely subdentate below, very broad and flattened or excavated on the face. It is composed principally of an opaque white layer which also lines the base but does not extend to the edge of the lip. The length of the shell varies between 15 mm and 26 mm. Its diameter varies between 17 mm and 24 mm.

Distribution
This genus occurs in the Indo-Pacific, including New Zealand, Japan, and other areas.

Species
Phylogram of the species in the genus Diloma:

Other species in the genus not included in the phylogram include: 

 Diloma durvillaea Spencer, Marshall & Waters, 2009
 Diloma nanum Gould, 1861
Species brought into synonymy:
 Diloma constellatum Souverbie, 1863: synonym of Austrocochlea constellata (Souverbie, 1863)
 Diloma coracina Suter, H., 1909: synonym of Diloma arida (Finlay, 1927)
 Diloma gaimardi Hutton: synonym of  Diloma aethiops Gmelin, 1791
 Diloma impervia (Menke, 1843): synonym of Oxystele impervia (Menke, 1843)
 Diloma piperinum (Philippi, 1849): synonym of Austrocochlea piperina (Philippi, 1849)
 Diloma sinensis (Gmelin, 1791) :synonym of Oxystele sinensis (Gmelin, 1791)
 Diloma suavis (Philippi, 1849): synonym of Pictodiloma suavis (Philippi, 1849)
 Diloma tabularis (Krauss, 1848): synonym of Oxystele tabularis (Krauss, 1848)
 Diloma tigrina (Anton, 1838): synonym of Oxystele tigrina (Anton, 1838)
 Diloma variegata (Anton, 1838): synonym of Oxystele variegata (Anton, 1838)
 Diloma novaezelandiae Anton, 1839: synonym of Diloma subrostrata (Gray in Yate, 1835)
 Diloma (Chlorodiloma) millelineata (Bonnett, 1864): synonym of Chlorodiloma millelineata (Bonnett, 1864)
 Diloma (Fractarmilla) lenior Finlay, H.J., 1927: synonym of  Diloma bicanaliculata (Dunker, 1844)

References

 Williams S.T., Karube S. & Ozawa T. (2008) Molecular systematics of Vetigastropoda: Trochidae, Turbinidae and Trochoidea redefined. Zoologica Scripta 37: 483–506

External links
 

 
Trochidae
Taxa named by Rodolfo Amando Philippi
Gastropod genera